This is a list of defunct Canadian television stations.

Defunct Canadian television stations
  CBEFT 
  CBKST 
  CBNLT 
  CBYT (TV) 
  CKER-TV - public-access cable station
  CFCL-TV 
  CFFB-TV 
  CFKL-TV 
  CFLA-TV 
  CFVO-TV 
  CFWH-TV 
  CHAB-TV 
  CHAK-TV 
  CHCA-TV 
  CHNB-TV 
  CHOY-TV 
  CIER-TV 
  CJBN-TV
  CJFB-TV 
  CJIC-TV 
  CJSS-TV 
  CKBI-TV 
  CKNC-TV 
  CKNX-TV 
  CKOS-TV 
  CKRN-DT
  CKX-TV 
  CKXT-DT
 PersonaTV – In Persona's largest markets in Ontario, the primary community channel was branded as Persona News #, where # refers to the channel's placement on the cable dial. Such channels were rebranded as Persona News in 2007.
 Teletoon Retro
 VE9EC

See also

 List of Canadian specialty channels
 List of Canadian television channels
 List of Canadian television networks
 List of defunct CBC and Radio-Canada television transmitters
 Lists of television stations in North America
 List of television stations in Canada by call sign

References

 
Defunct Canadian television stations